Grey Goose may refer to:
 Gray Goose Laws, a collection of laws from the Icelandic Commonwealth period
 Grey goose, a bird
 Grey Goose (band), a band from Gainesville, Florida with Good Life Recordings
 "Grey Goose" (folk song), a traditional American folk song, originally recorded by Lead Belly 
 Grey Goose (vodka), a brand of vodka distilled in Cognac, France from French wheat
 Grey Goose Bus Lines, a subsidiary of Greyhound Canada
 Grey Goose Island, an uninhabited arctic island in Nunavut, Canada
 Grey Goose Music, a recording and music publishing company named after the folk song